Traditional Catholic Calendar may refer to:

 Tridentine calendar
 General Roman Calendar of 1954
 General Roman Calendar of Pope Pius XII
 General Roman Calendar of 1960